K56 or K-56 may refer to:

 K-56 (1927–1937 Kansas highway), an historical designation of Kansas state highway K-52
 K-56 (1937–1957 Kansas highway), an historical designation of Kansas state highway K-98
 HMS Asphodel (K56), a British Royal Navy Flower-class corvette
 Potassium-56 (K-56 or 56K), an isotope of potassium
 Soviet submarine K-56, various submarines of the Soviet Navy

See also
Koolhoven F.K.56, a 1930s Dutch aircraft